Wesley Koolhof and Matwé Middelkoop were the defending champions, but chose to compete with different partners in Auckland instead.

Łukasz Kubot and Marcelo Melo won the title, defeating Jan-Lennard Struff and Viktor Troicki in the final, 6–3, 6–4.

Seeds

Draw

Draw

Notes

References
 Main Draw

M